Haywire is a fictional superhero appearing in American comic books published by Marvel Comics.

Publication history
Haywire was originally a character from the Squadron Supreme limited series from Marvel Comics.

Fictional character biography
Haywire (Harold Danforth) has the ability to create and project strands of 5mm diameter metallic "tanglewires". These wires can be created at some distance from his body, and disappear if he loses consciousness. Haywire was a member of Nighthawk's group of freedom fighters, the Redeemers, whose purpose was to overthrow the government controlled by the Squadron Supreme. During this time he was romantically involved with fellow Redeemer Inertia. Haywire was one of the Redeemers who joined the Squadron Supreme as a double agent in order to sabotage their efforts at world conquest. He accompanied Lamprey and the Whizzer on a tour of the hibernacle, and then led Lamprey into Redeemers headquarters for deprogramming. With his fellow Redeemers, Haywire fought the Squadron, forcing them to end their dictatorship over the United States of "Other-Earth".  Haywire battled the Whizzer during the huge battle. After the battle, some of the surviving Redeemers joined the Squadron Supreme, including Haywire.

Haywire worked with fellow Squadron members to prevent the destruction of their universe by the Nth Man. Haywire witnesses the grisly death of his girlfriend Inertia at the hands of the Nth Man.  Because of the events of that encounter, the Squadron Supreme became stranded on "mainstream" Earth.  They relocated to Project: Pegasus headquarters.  Alongside the Shape, Haywire was mind-controlled by the Over-Mind into battling Quasar to cover the Over-Mind's escape from Earth. Haywire participated in Doctor Strange's failed attempt to return the Squadron to their own Earth.

When the rest of the Squadron finally did return home, Haywire chose to remain on Marvel-Earth. Sometime later, Haywire happened across a battle between Thanos of Titan (self-styled god of death) and Mantis (also known as the Celestial Madonna), as Thanos attempted to destroy Quoi, her child (destined to become the Celestial Messiah). Haywire tried to help Mantis and eventually, Mantis elicited help from Haywire and an assemblage of Avengers in defeating Thanos's efforts to kill her son. In the process, Haywire hoped to encounter the cosmic embodiment of Death in order to bid it to restore Inertia to life. Ultimately, Haywire got his chance, but Death did not respond to his pleas. Distraught and obsessed, Haywire leapt into the form of Death itself and was destroyed.

Powers and abilities
Haywire had the ability to psionically generate a steel-like "tanglewire" filament from his fingertips which he can use for a variety of purposes, including creating long grappling wires for locomotion, vast quantities for trapping, entangling, or binding his opponents, or forming simple shapes like spheres, cubes, and cones. The tanglewire can be sharp or safe, according to his will. The tanglewire is extremely tensile and durable; only omnium and adamantium can cut through it. The tanglewire is resistant to extremes of temperature and pressure. The tanglewire will remain in existence indefinitely or until he consciously wills it to dissipate, and will remain in existence if he is rendered unconscious. There is no known limit to the amount of tanglewire he can generate. He wears padded leather gloves to enable him to hold onto his tanglewire when necessary.

Haywire was an athletic man, who was coached in hand-to-hand combat by Nighthawk, and later by his fellow Squadron Supreme members. He was skilled in lock picking and guitar playing.

References

External links
Marvel Heroes Classic Roleplaying Game page on Haywire
Marvel.com Haywire page

Characters created by Mark Gruenwald
Comics characters introduced in 1986
Marvel Comics male superheroes
Marvel Comics superheroes
Squadron Supreme